The Women's School of Planning and Architecture (WSPA) was an educational program for women interested in architecture, planning, and environmental design that presented sessions and symposia between 1976 and 1981. The School was founded by Katrin Adam, Ellen Perry Berkeley, Noel Phyllis Birkby, Bobbie Sue Hood, Marie I. Kennedy, Joan Forrester Sprague, and Leslie Kanes Weisman.

Founding
The founders met through professional organizations for women architects and planners (beginning in 1972) and attendance at the first U.S. conferences on women in architecture in 1974 and 1975. According to the 1975 WSPA brochure, these opportunities to meet and share experiences with other women professionals led them to a conviction that an alternative educational experience would be a valuable way to address the "shared common goals and interests not being met within the existing professional contexts."

The same brochure describes the founders goals:

Mission and purpose
WSPA was designed as a form of organization providing a style of educational experience that incorporated feminist principles in form as well as content. There was no set format for WSPA sessions, and the coordinators used feedback from participants to make adjustments and innovations designed to help the organization better meet its goals. Within a general set of criteria, the founders envisioned an ever-changing and evolving entity responsive to the needs of the participants.

The School aimed to attract participants from diverse backgrounds and geographic locations by making an interest in environmental design the only admission "requirement" and by holding each session at a different location. Tuition was kept to a minimum and work-study scholarships were available. While the focus of the earlier sessions could be characterized as "consciousness raising, skill building, and [theoretical discussion]" among women who were primarily professionals and academics, in its latter years WSPA was moving toward involvement in political activism based on collaboration with "grassroots women."

According to co-founders Noel Phyllis Birkby and Leslie Kanes Weisman, all participants in WSPA were considered members of a peer group "equally responsible and equally capable of making a contribution". Sessions were planned by a group of Coordinators who were essentially self-selected, based on their willingness and ability to devote the time and energy necessary to bring off a successful session. The Coordinators were paid through income generated by tuition fees.

Curriculum and sessions
The curriculum was designed to offer subject matter unavailable in standard academic or professional settings and particularly emphasized skills that were not valued in male-dominated architectural firms. Courses were conducted by methods designed to "eliminate some of the effects of male-defined and identified educations." Instructors emphasized "the active participation of all members of the group, minimizing the role of the coordinators as experts or authorities," while maximizing their "roles as information sources and organizers".

There were five WSPA sessions in all: at St. Joseph's College in Biddeford, Maine, in 1975; at Stephenson College in Santa Cruz, California, in 1976; at Roger Williams College in Bristol, Rhode Island, in 1978; at Regis College in Denver, Colorado, in 1979; and a weekend symposium in Washington, DC, in 1981. A session planned and advertised for 1980 at Hood College in Frederick, Maryland, was cancelled when registration targets were not met.

WSPA hosted a national women's symposium "Community-Based Alternatives and Women in the Eighties," on May 17–20, 1981, at American University, Washington, DC. The event focused on women in the areas of housing, employment, economic development, education and cooperative development. Despite ongoing efforts, WSPA's final project was a 1983-1984 Design Arts Grant from the National Endowment for the Arts (NEA) for "Architectural Quality in Urban Homesteading," a project with a stated aim to help urban homesteaders, many of whom where women, "achieve architectural quality in buildings rehabilitated and cooperatively owned and managed by homesteaders through a participatory design process."

WSPA programming focused on reforming the design professions to include women. Courses like "Demystification of Tools in Relation to Design" taught by Katrin Adam, emphasized practical skills, and courses such as "Women and the Built Environment: Personal, Social, and Professional Perceptions," taught by Birkby and others, encouraging women to consider broader issues of significance to women in built and symbolic environments. The participants who brought children to the two-week program where provided with childcare arranged through a work study program on each campus.

Legacy
Though WSPA remained a legal corporation after the final session in 1981, no additional sessions came to fruition. Internal struggles developed, the School was perpetually short of money, and, probably most importantly, no group of Coordinators came forward to take on the challenge of planning a session. 

In a 1989 piece on WSPA for the book Architecture: A Place for Women, Leslie Kanes Weisman described it as a product of its time, ideal for "the consciousness-raising task of defining problems," but less useful for "designing and implementing solutions."

References

External links 
 Women's School of Planning and Architecture records at the Sophia Smith Collection, Smith College Special Collections

Women architects
Women's education in the United States